All-Ukrainian Agrarian Association "Spade" (Zastup) is a Ukrainian political party registered on 4 May 2011.

Its name is an obsolete form that means "spade". Zastup is also a portmanteau standing for Za Sotsialnu Trudovu Ukrainsku Perspektyvu, meaning For Social Laborious Ukrainian Perspective. The party's former name was "People's Initiative". The party is led by Vira Ulianchenko, who is a former head of Ukraine's Presidential Administration.

It participated in the 2014 election to the Verkhovna Rada. The party won one seat when its unaffiliated candidate Valeriy Davydenko won in the 208th single-member constituency located in Bakhmach. He won with 38.86% of the vote. Davydenko later joined the parliamentary faction of Petro Poroshenko Bloc. Davydenko was re-elected, after again a win in the 208th constituency (with 37,43% of the vote) but this time as an independent candidate, in the 2019 Ukrainian parliamentary election.

Election results

Verkhovna Rada

References

External links
 Official website 

Political parties in Ukraine
Agrarian parties in Ukraine
2011 establishments in Ukraine
Political parties established in 2011